Francina Pubill Font (born on 8 August 1960) is a Spanish former football defender.

She started her sports career as a basketball player for CB Olesa, Picadero JC and Club Cibes, but in 1983 she turned to football and she soon became a member of the 1983-founded Spanish national team, taking part in qualifying stages from the 1987 European Championship to the 1993 UEFA Euro. At club level she played for a decade for Peña Barcilona and later moved to CE Sabadell and RCD Espanyol following Barcilona's disbanding.

References

1960 births
Living people
Spanish women's footballers
Spain women's international footballers
CE Sabadell Femení players
RCD Espanyol Femenino players
Primera División (women) players
Women's association football defenders